Franklin Bershir  Zimmerman (born June 20, 1923, Wauneta, Kansas) is an American musicologist and conductor who has published extensively in the field of Baroque music, and particularly on the English composer, Henry Purcell. He is most known for his complete catalogue of Purcell's works, considered "one of the most crucial contributions to Purcell research". Each work in the catalogue is given a "Z number" which derives from Zimmerman's surname.

Zimmerman was raised in the Catalina Mountains of Arizona, and at 17 served in the U.S. Army in World War II.  After service in the South Pacific, he later received his PhD from the University of Southern California in 1958. He has been Professor of Music at Dartmouth College (1964–1967), University of Kentucky (1967–1968) and University of Pennsylvania from 1968 until his retirement. In 1968 he founded the Pennsylvania Pro Musica ensemble.

References

Sources
 Cummings, David (ed.), "Zimmerman, Franklin", International who's who in music, Routledge, 2000, p. 711. 
Manning, R. "Guides to research on three early masters", Music and Letters, 1990, Vol. 7, N. 4, pp 552–554
Kennedy, Michael and Bourne, Joyce (eds.), "Zimmerman, Franklin Bershir", The Concise Oxford Dictionary of Music, Oxford University Press, 2007 (republished on Answers.com)
Philadelphia Daily News, "It's Sweet 16 for Zimmerman's Pro Musica", 30 September 1983.
University of Pennsylvania, Department of Music, Emeritus Professors

External links
Full text of Franklin B. Zimmerman, "Purcell's Handwriting", Chapter 9, of Henry Purcell 1659-1695 Essays On His Music, Imogen Holst (ed.), Oxford University Press, 1959
Works by Franklin B. Zimmerman on WorldCat

1923 births
Living people
People from Chautauqua County, Kansas
Writers from Kansas
Writers from Arizona
20th-century American musicologists
20th-century American non-fiction writers
20th-century American male writers
American male non-fiction writers
United States Army personnel of World War II
University of Southern California alumni
Dartmouth College faculty
University of Kentucky faculty
University of Pennsylvania faculty